The  was a Japanese domain of the Edo period.  It is associated with Hizen Province in modern-day Saga Prefecture.

In the han system, Shimabara was a political and economic abstraction based on periodic cadastral surveys and projected agricultural yields.  In other words, the domain was defined in terms of kokudaka, not land area. This was different from the feudalism of the West.

History
The Arima clan, who were Kirishitan daimyōs, ruled over Shimabara Domain in the late Muromachi period from Hinoe Castle and Hara Castle. In 1614, the Tokugawa Bakufu banned Christianity and replaced Arima Naozumi with Matsukura Shigemasa. Matsukura, who strictly enforced the prohibition against Christianity with mass executions, also severely raised taxes to pay for the construction of his new Shimabara Castle from 1618 to 1624. This oppression of the peasants was a major factor leading to the Shimabara Rebellion.

After the rebellion was suppressed, the domain was given to the Kōriki clan. It then passed to the Fukōzu-Matsudaira family, who ruled it from 1669 until 1871 (with a brief hiatus from 1749 to 1774, during which the domain was ruled by the Toda clan, cousins of the Fukōzu-Matsudaira).

In the Bakumatsu period, Matsudaira Tadachika became an influential official in the Tokugawa administration. However, the final daimyō of Shimabara, Matsudaira Tadakazu pledged Shimabara domain in support of Emperor Meiji in the Boshin War, proved his loyalty by committing his troops to the northern campaign against the Ōuetsu Reppan Dōmei, fighting at Akita and Morioka.

List of daimyōs 
The hereditary daimyōs were head of the clan and head of the domain.

Arima clan, 1600–1614 (tozama; 28,000 koku)
{| class=wikitable
!  ||Name || Tenure || Courtesy title || Court Rank || Revenue
|-
||1||||1600–1612||Shūri-daiyū (修理大夫) || Lower 5th (従五位下) ||40,000 koku
|-
||2||||1612–1614||Saiemonfu (左衛門佐) || Lower 5th (従五位下) ||40,000 koku
|-
|}

Tenryō
Matsukura clan, 1616–1638 (tozama; 40,000 koku)
{| class=wikitable
!  ||Name || Tenure || Courtesy title || Court Rank || Revenue
|-
||1||||1616–1630||Bungo-no-kami || Lower 5th (従五位下) ||40,000 koku
|-
||2||||1630–1638||Nagato-no-kami || Lower 5th (従五位下) ||40,000 koku
|-
|}

Kōriki clan, 1638–1668 (fudai; 40,000 koku)
{| class=wikitable
!  ||Name || Tenure || Courtesy title || Court Rank || Revenue
|-
||1||||1638–1655||Sakontaiyu (左近大夫) || Lower 5th (従五位下) ||40,000 koku
|-
||2||||1655–1668|| Sakontaiyu (左近大夫) || Lower 5th (従五位下) ||40,000 koku
|-
|}

Matsudaira (Fukōzu) clan, 1669–1749 (fudai; 70,000 koku)
{| class=wikitable
!  ||Name || Tenure || Courtesy title || Court Rank || Revenue
|-
||1||||1669–1698||Tonomori-no-tsukasa　(主殿頭) || Lower 4th (従四位下) ||65,000 koku
|-
||2||||1698–1735|| Tonomori-no-tsukasa　(主殿頭) || Lower 4th (従四位下) ||65,000 koku
|-
||3||||1735–1738|| Tonomori-no-tsukasa　(主殿頭) || Lower 5th (従五位下) ||65,000 koku
|-
||4||||1738–1749|| Tonomori-no-tsukasa　(主殿頭) || Lower 4th (従四位下) ||65,000 koku
|-
||5||||1749|| Tonomori-no-tsukasa　(主殿頭) || Lower 4th (従四位下) ||65,000 koku
|-
|}

Toda clan, 1749–1774 (fudai; 77,000 koku)
{| class=wikitable
!  ||Name || Tenure || Courtesy title || Court Rank || Revenue
|-
||1||||1749–1754||Hyuga-no-kami || Lower 5th (従五位下) ||77,000 koku
|-
||2||||1754–1774||Iki-no-kami || Lower 5th (従五位下) ||77,000 koku
|-
|}

Matsudaira (Fukōzu) clan, 1774–1871 (fudai; 70,000 koku)
{| class=wikitable
!  ||Name || Tenure || Courtesy title || Court Rank || Revenue
|-
||1||||1774–1792||Yamato-no-kami || Lower 5th (従五位下) ||65,000 koku
|-
||2||||1792–1819|| Tonomori-no-tsukasa　(主殿頭) || Lower 5th (従五位下) ||65,000 koku
|-
||3||||1819–1840|| Tonomori-no-tsukasa　(主殿頭) || Lower 5th (従五位下) ||65,000 koku
|-
||4||||1840–1847|| Tonomori-no-tsukasa　(主殿頭) || Lower 5th (従五位下) ||65,000 koku
|-
||5||||1847–1859|| Tonomori-no-tsukasa　(主殿頭) || Lower 5th (従五位下) ||65,000 koku
|-
||6||||1859–1860|| Tonomori-no-tsukasa　(主殿頭) || Lower 5th (従五位下) ||65,000 koku
|-
||7||||1860–1862|| Tonomori-no-tsukasa　(主殿頭) || Lower 5th (従五位下) ||65,000 koku
|-
||8||||1862–1871|| Tonomori-no-tsukasa　(主殿頭) || Lower 5th (従五位下) ||65,000 koku
|-
|}

Simplified genealogy (Matsudaira-Fukōzu)

Matsudaira Nobumitsu, 3rd head of the Matsudaira (c.  – )
Chikatada, 4th head of the Matsudaira (c. 1431–1531)
 Nagachika, 5th head of the Matsudaira (1473–1544)
 Nobutada, 6th head of the Matsudaira (1490–1531)
 Kiyoyasu, 7th head of the Matsudaira (1511–1536)
Usui-hime, m. Sakai Tadatsugu (1527–1596)
 Ogasawara Nobuyuki, 1st daimyō of Koga (1570–1614)
 daughter, (m.?) Mizuno Tadasada
 daughter, m. Tsuchiya Kazunao, 1st daimyō of Tsuchiura (1608–1679)
 Tsuchiya Masanao, 2nd daimyō of Tsuchiura (1641–1722)
 Tsuchiya Nobunao, 3rd daimyō of Tsuchiura (1696–1734)
 daughter, m.  IV. Matsudaira Tadatoki, 4th daimyō of Shimabara (1st creation) (1716–1749; r. 1738–1749).
 V. Tadamasa, 5th daimyō of Shimabara (1st creation) ( – 1801; r. 1749)
  I. Tadahiro, 1st daimyō of Shimabara (2nd creation, cr. 1774) ( – 1792; r. 1774–1792)
  II. Tadayori, 2nd daimyō of Shimabara (2nd creation) (1771–1819; r. 1792–1819)
 III. Tadayoshi, 3rd daimyō of Shimabara (2nd creation) (1799–1840; r. 1819–1840)
 IV. Tadanari, 4th daimyō of Shimabara (2nd creation) (1824–1847; r. 1840–1847)
  V. Tadakiyo, 5th daimyō of Shimabara (2nd creation) (1832–1859; r. 1847–1859)
 Tadaatsu
  VII. Tadachika, 7th daimyō of Shimabara (2nd creation) (1845–1862; r. 1860–1862)
 Hirotada, 8th head of the Matsudaira (1526–1549)
 Tokugawa Ieyasu, 1st Tokugawa shōgun (1543–1616; r. 1603–1605)
Matsudaira Nobuyasu (1559–1579)
 Kuma-hime (1577–1626), m. Honda Tadamasa, 2nd daimyō of Kuwana (1575–1631)
 Kuni-hime (1595–1649), m. Arima Naozumi, daimyō of Shimabara (1586–1641)
 daughter, m. Akimoto Tomitomo, 1st daimyō of Yamura (1610–1657)
 daughter, m. Toda Takamasa, 1st daimyō of Sakura (1632–1699)
 Toda Tadaaki
Toda Tadami, 2nd daimyō of Utsunomiya (1689–1746)
Toda Tadamitsu, daimyō of Shimabara (1730–1781)
 Toda Tadatō, daimyō of Shimabara (1739–1801)
 daughter, m.  II. Matsudaira Tadakatsu, 2nd daimyō of Shimabara (1st creation) (1673–1736; r. 1698–1735). He adopted a distant relation:
  III. Matsudaira Tadami, 3rd daimyō of Shimabara (1st creation) (1712–1738; r. 1735–1738). He adopted a cousin, Tadatoki, son of Matsudaira Kankei, a hatamoto (see above):
Kame-hime (1560–1625), m. Okudaira Nobumasa, 1st daimyō of Kanō (1555–1615)
 Matsudaira Tadaaki, 1st daimyō of Himeji (1583–1644)
 Eshō-in, m. Nabeshima Tadanao (1613–1635)
 Nabeshima Mitsushige, 2nd daimyō of Saga (1632–1700)
 Nabeshima Muneshige, 5th daimyō of Saga (1687–1755)
 Nabeshima Harushige, 8th daimyō of Saga (1745–1805)
 daughter, m. Date Munetada, 7th daimyō of Uwajima (1792–1889)
  VI. Matsudaira Tadaatsu, 6th daimyō of Shimabara (2nd creation) (1841–1860; r. 1859–1860)
 Tokugawa Yorifusa, 1st daimyō of Mito (1603–1661)
 Matsudaira Yorishige, 1st daimyō of Takamatsu (1622–1695)
 Yoritoshi (1661–1687)
 Yoritoyo, 3rd daimyō of Takamatsu (1680–1735)
 Tokugawa Munetaka, 4th daimyō of Mito (1705–1730)
 Tokugawa Munemoto, 5th daimyō of Mito (1728–1766)
 Tokugawa Harumori, 6th daimyō of Mito (1751–1805)
 Tokugawa Harutoshi, 7th daimyō of Mito (1773–1816)
 Tokugawa Nariaki, 9th daimyō of Mito (1800–1860)
  VIII. Tadakazu, 8th daimyō of Shimabara (2nd creation), 8th family head, 1st Viscount (1851–1917; daimyō: 1862–1869; Governor: 1869–1871; family head: 1862–1917; Viscount: cr. 1884)
 Tadaii (1870–1909)
 Tadaryō, 9th family head, 2nd Viscount (1903–1934; 9th family head and 2nd Viscount: 1917–1934)
 Tadasada, 10th family head, 3rd Viscount (born 1928; 10th family head: 1934–present; 3rd Viscount: 1934–1947)
Tadatsugu (b. 1965)
 Tadaoki (b. 1967)
 Tadakage (d. 1485)
 Tadasada
 Yoshikage (1517–1561)
 Koretada (1537–1575)
 Ietada, daimyō of Omigawa (1555–1600)
 Tadatoshi, 1st daimyō of Yoshida (1582–1632)
  I. Tadafusa, 1st daimyō of Shimabara (1st creation, cr. 1669) (1619–1700; daimyō: 1669–1698)

See also 
 List of Han
 Abolition of the han system

References

External links
 "Shimabara" at Edo 300 

Domains of Japan